A list of Bangladesh national football team results:

 Bangladesh national football team results (1973–1999)
 Bangladesh national football team results (2000–2019)
 Bangladesh national football team results (2020–present)